Monika Baer (1964) is a German painter.
She was born in Freiburg and studied at the Düsseldorf Art Academy. 

In 2014 the Chicago Art Institute held a survey exhibition of her work. Her work is included in the collections of the Kunstmuseum Bonn, the Museum Brandhorst, the Barcelona Museum of Contemporary Art, the Williams College Museum of Art, and the Museum of Modern Art, New York.

References

21st-century German women artists
20th-century German women artists
1964 births
Living people
German women painters
20th-century German painters
21st-century German painters
People from Freiberg
Kunstakademie Düsseldorf alumni